In Hindu texts, the Puru and Yadu Dynasties are the descendants of legendary King Pururavas who was a famous Hindu ruler in the Treta Yuga. Pururavas was the son of Ila and Budha. Some of the dynasties' important members were Yayati, Yadu, King Puru, Turvasu, Druhyu and Anu. According to Hindu religious books, Yayāti was one of the ancestors of Pandavas and the Yaduvamsha.

Chandravamsha clan 

Pururavas was the Hindu kshatriya ruler of Treta Yuga. According to the Ramayana and the Mahabharata, King Pururavas was the son of Ila and Budha. Some important members were Yayati, Yadu, King Puru, Turvasu, Druhyu and Anu. According to Mahabharata, Pandavas and Kauravas were from the lineage of King Puru. Kartavirya Arjuna, Shree Krishna and Balarama were from the lineage of King Yadu. Yadu Vamsa known as Yadavas.
Turvasu's descendants were Mleccha of Balochistan and Dravidas of South India. Druhyu's descendants included Gandhara and Shakuni. Anu's descendants included Madras, Kekayas, King Ushinara and Shibi Chakravarthi.

 Lord Brahma
 Brahmarshi Atri
 Chandra Deva
 Budha (Mercury)

The Lunar Dynasty descendants 

The Lunar Dynasty was started in Treta Yuga. Yaduvamsha is a subdivision of Lunar Dynasty. Ancestors of Yaduvamsha was Chandravamsha.

 Pururavas
 Aayu, Shrutayu, Satyayu, Raya, Jaya and Vijaya were the sons of King Pururavas
 Nahusha, Kshatravrdhdha, Raji, Rabha and Anena were the sons of Aayu
 Yati, king Yayati, Samyati, Ayati, Viyati, Nishant Chandravamsha and Kriti were the sons of Nahusha.

Yayati (Contemporary to Demon King Vrishparva) had two wives and five sons. Yadu, Turvasu, Druhyu, Anu and King Puru were the five sons of Yayati. Devayani and Sharmishtha were the two wives of Yayati. Yayati, later, became the most powerful ruler of his era.

Genealogy

Emperor Puru dynasty 

The Puru Dynasty Kings such as King Puru and Janamejaya were once defeated by Ravana of Lanka.

Emperor Bharata dynasty 

Bharata (Mahabharata) conquered the whole world from Kashmir (pole) to Kumari (coast) and established the great Lunar dynasty and by the glory, zenith and name of this king, India was called as Bharatavarsha or Bharatakhanda or Bharatadesha or Bharata. He was named so because he had the blessings of Goddess Saraswati and Lord Hayagriva. India developed Vedic studies (Sanatana Dharma) in the Vedic Period.

Ajamida dynasty 

Once in Treta Yuga, there lived a sage called Chuli. He was named so because he worships the lord Shiva always with a Shulam (Trident). Apsara Somada who was the daughter of Apsaras Urmila came to him. Then Sage asked what she wanted. Somada asked him to marry her and to give a brave and a valiant son. Soon they were married and in short time a son was born to them. He was Brahmadatta I who married 100 daughters of Kushanabha who was the grandfather of Sage Vishwamitra and this king formed his kingdom's capital named Kampilya long before the 5 Panchala brothers. But his dynasty's reign were very short.

After his descendants' reign, it came under the control of the Paurava, Ajamida II, who was a descendant of Puru.

Panchala dynasty

Ajamida II had a son named Rishin (a saintly king). Rishin had 2 sons namely Samvarana II whose son was Kuru and Brihadvasu whose descendants were Panchalas.

Kuru dynasty 

Kuru II, a king of Puru dynasty after whom the dynasty was named 'Kuruvansha' or 'Kaurava'. After his name, the district in Haryana was called as Kurukshetra. This battlefield before the birth of Bhishma, Shantanu and Pratipa was the Yagnabhumi (sacred place or sacrificial place or capital city of Kuru Kingdom) of this King in Dvapara Yuga. By the glory, zenith and name of this king the dynasty was hence the Kuru Dynasty and the kingdom was renamed from Paurava Kingdom to Kuru Kingdom. After these Kings several kings of this dynasty established several kingdoms. He had three sons, namely Vidhuratha I who became the ruler of Pratisthana, Vyushitaswa who died at a very young age, and Sudhanva, who became the ruler of Magadha. Henceforth, Vidhuratha became the king of Hastinapura.

Magadha dynasty 

Sudhanva, son of Kuru II, became the king of Magadha.

 Sudhanva 
 Sudhanu
 Suhotra
 Chyavana
 Chavana
 Krtri
 Kriti
 Krta
 Krtyagya
 Krtavirya
 Krtasena
 Krtaka
 Uparichara Vasu (Devotee of Lord Vishnu and a friend of Devaraja Indra) conquered Chedi Kingdom.
 Brihadratha (became the King of Magadha), Pratyagraha became the King of Chedi whose Great-Grandson was Shishupala, Kusambhi (Vatsa), Mavella, Yadu and Matsya (founder of Matsya Kingdom whose Great-Grandson was Virata who was the founder of Viratanagara) were the sons of Vasu and Satyavati who later married Shantanu was the daughter of Vasu.

Brihadratha dynasty 

Brihadratha, king of Magadha, started the Brihadratha dynasty.

Emperor Yadu dynasty  

Once Yadu dynasty King Yayati was suffering from a curse, he requested his five sons to help relieve him from that curse. All the four sons disagreed to help except the youngest. Yayati cursed his eldest son Yadu that his descendants are not worth to be a royal one. Yadu apologized for the mistake he committed. Yayati gave him a boon that Lord Narayana himself will born in his dynasty. The descendants of Yadu were Sahasrabahu Kartavirya Arjuna, Krishna etc.

Heheya Kingdom 

Sahasrajit was the eldest son of Yadu whose descendant were Haihayas. After Kartavirya Arjuna, his grandsons Talajangha and his son, Vitihotra had occupied Ayodhya which was ruled by Rama's ancestor Sagara's father Bahuka who was also known as Asita. Talajangha, his son Vitihotra were killed by King Sagara. Their descendants (Madhu and Vrshni) exiled to Kroshtas, a division of Yadava Dynasty.

 Sahasrajit 
 Satajit
 Mahahaya, Renuhaya and Haihaya (the founder of Haihaya Kingdom). (Contemporary to Suryavanshi king Mandhatri)
 Dharma was the son of Haihaya.
 Netra
 Kunti
 Sohanji
 Mahishman was the founder of Mahishmati on the banks of River Narmada.
 Bhadrasenaka (Bhadrasena) (Contemporary to Suryavanshi king Trishanku)
 Durmada (Contemporary to Suryavanshi king Harischandra)
 Durdama
 Bhima
 Samhata
 Kanaka
 Dhanaka (Lord Vishnu)
 Krtavirya, Krtagni, Krtavarma and Krtauja. (Contemporary to Suryavanshi king Rohitashva)
 Sahasrabahu Kartavirya Arjuna was the son of Krtavirya who ruled 88,000 years and was finally killed by Lord Parashurama.
 Jayadhwaja, Vrshabha, Madhu and Urujit were left by Parshurama and 995 others were killed by Lord Parashurama. Pajanya was adopted by Kroshta king Devamidha
 Talajangha (Contemporary to Suryavanshi king Asita) 
 Vithihotra (Contemporary to Suryavanshi king Sagara)
 Madhu
 Vrshni

Kroshta dynasty 

Yadu had a son named Kroshta whose descendant was Krishna. Once, Satvata and his son Bhima caught hold of Lord Rama's Ashwamedha sacrifice horse and then they were defeated by Hanuman and Shatrughna and the Yadava Kingdom was given to Ikshvaku Dynasty. Rama then gave the kingdom to Shatrughna's son Subahu before his journey to Vaikunta. Then, finally Andhaka (Son of Bhima) recovered his paternal kingdom from Subahu after the journey to Vaikunta of Rama.

 Yadu was the Founder of Yadu Dynasty and Yadava Kingdom (contemporary of God Parashurama)
 Kroshta 
 Vrajnivan 
 Vrajpita
 Bhima I
 Nivriti
 Viduratha
 Vikrati
 Vikravan
 Swahi
 Swati
 Ushnaka
 Rasadu
 Chitraratha I
 Sashabindu (Contemporary to Suryavanshi King Mandhata)
 Madhu I (By the name and glory of this king, Lord Krishna was called Madhava and the Yadavas were called Madhu Yadava or Madhavas)
 Prithushrava 
 Vrishni I was a Yadava king whose dynasty was called as Vrshni Dynasty.

Vrishni dynasty

Vrishni I was a great Yadava king. His descendants were the Vrishni Yadavas, Chedi Yadavas and Kukura Yadavas. His son was Antara.
 Antara
 Suyajna
 Ushna
 Marutta
 Kambhoja was a Bhoja King who founded the Kamboja Kingdom and his descendants were Kambhojas
 Shineyu
 Ruchaka
 Rukmakavacha
 Jayamadha
 Vidarbha was the Founder of Vidarbha Kingdom (Contemporary to Suryavanshi King Bahuka)
 Kratha (Contemporary to Suryavanshi King Sagara)
 Raivata
 Vishwagarbha
 Padmavarna
 Sarasa
 Harita
 Madhu II
 Madhava
 Puruvasa
 Purudvan
 Jantu 
 Satvata was a Yadava King whose descendants were called Satvatas. (Contemporary to Lord Rama)
 Bhima II (Contemporary to Suryavanshi King Kusha)
 Andhaka was another Yadava King whose descendants were called Andhakas. 
 Mahabhoja was a Yadava King who married Kanakamalika who was the granddaughter of Lord Rama and Sita. She was the Daughter of King Kusha (Ramayana).
 Raivata (Contemporary to Suryavanshi King Athithi)
 Vishwagarbha
 Vasu
 Kriti 
 Kunti
 Dhrishti 
 Turvasu
 Darsha
 Vyoma
 Jimuta
 Vikruthi
 Bhimaratha
 Rathvara
 Navratha
 Dashratha
 Ekadasharatha
 Shakuni
 Karibhi
 Devarata
 Devakshetra
 Devala
 Madhu
 Bhajmana
 Puruvasha
 Puruhotra
 Kumaravansha 
 Kumbalabarhi
 Rukamatwacha
 Kuruvasha
 Anu
 Pravarta
 Purumitra
 Shrikara was a Yadava King who was the disciple of lord Hanuman. After completing education from lord Hanuman, he got a boon from lord Hanuman was that lord Narayana will take birth in Yadu's dynasty.
 Chitraratha II
 Viduratha
 Shoora
 Sharma
 Prathikshara
 Swayambhoja
 Hridhika
 Vrishni II
 Devamidha
 Surasena was the son of Madisha and Parjanya was the son of Vesparna(2nd wife of Devamidha).
 Vasudeva and others were the son of Surasena and Nanda Baba was the son of Parjanya
 Balarama, Krishna and others were the sons of Vasudeva.
Yogmaya was daughter of Nanda Baba.
 Pradyumna was the son of Krishna.
 Aniruddha 
 Vajranabha
 Pratibahu
 Subahu
 Shantasena
 Shatasena

Chedi dynasty 

Yadu's descendant Vidarbha, who was the founder of the Vidarbha Kingdom, has three sons: Kusha, Kratha and Romapada. Kusha was the founder of Dwaraka. Romapada was given central India Madhya Pradesh. King Romapada's descendants were the Chedis. During the reign of Lord Rama, Tamana and his father Subahu II fought against Rama while doing Ashvamedha sacrifice and were defeated by Lord Hanuman. Later, Uparichara Vasu conquered Chedi.

 Romapada
 Babhru
 Krti
 Ushika
 Chedi was the founder of the Chedi Kingdom
 Subahu I (contemporary of Suryavanshi King Rituparna and Nala and Damayanti)
 Virabahu
 Subahu II
 Tamana (contemporary of Lord Rama)

Kukura dynasty 

Vishwagarbha, a descendant of Vrishni had a son named Vasu. Vasu had two sons, Kriti and Kukura. Kriti's descendants were Shurasena, Vasudeva, Kunti, etc. Kukura's descendants were Ugrasena, Kamsa and Devaki, adopted daughter of Ugrasena. After Devaka, his younger brother Ugrasena reigned at Mathura.

 Kukura
 Vrshni
 Riksha
 Kapotarma
 Tittiri
 Punarvasu
 Abhijit
 Dhrshnu
 Ahuka
 Devaka and Ugrasena
 Kamsa and 10 others were the children of Ugrasena while Devaki, the daughter of Devaka, was the adoptive daughter of Ugrasena.

See also 
 Vedic Period
 Puranic chronology
 History of Hinduism
 Solar dynasty & Lunar dynasty
 List of Indian monarchs
 Turvasu Druhyu and Anu Dynasties
 List of Ikshvaku dynasty kings
 List of Hindu empires and dynasties

References 

 The Mahabharata of Krishna-Dwaipayana Vyasa Translated into English Prose'', Bharata Press, Calcutta (1883–1896)

External links 

 Mahabharata 

Lunar dynasty
Mahabharata